Zahreelay is a 1990 Hindi-language action film, produced and directed by Jyotin Goel under the Goel Screen Crafts banner. It stars Jeetendra, Sanjay Dutt, Chunky Pandey, Juhi Chawla in the pivotal roles and music composed by Anand–Milind.

Plot
Captain Jaswanth Kumar is a lionhearted Indian Army soldier who loses his left arm in the battle. Then, he decides to lead a peaceful life, reaches Bombay, and settles in a colony called Shanti Nagar. Thereupon, he befriends several people Journalist A.K.Razdan, Raju a taxi driver, and his widowed sister Seema, Chamki Raju's love interest, etc. Here, Jaswanth spots the public dying out of extortion, corruption & racism made by malefactors under the garb of an association Raksha Mandal led by a chair Taneja. Jaswanth audaciously challenges their violations and molds scaredy-cat, Raju, as gallant. Seema adores his idolizes and he too loves her. Moreover, he awakes the public who battle against anarchy & depravity. Being cognizant of it, Taneja blazes and triggers a hazardous goon Raaka to eliminate the diehard. Initially, Raaka wars on them but he is smashed. So, he hoodwinks in the name of friendship as a renewed person. Parallelly, as an anecdote, Raaka loves a prostitute Shabnam one that carries his child and also feels happy about his change. Raaka treacherously implicates and gets Jaswanth & Raju penalize. Then, Razdan collects all the pieces of evidence against Taneja and he is killed. Despite having the ability to save him Raaka is back. Knowing it, Shabnam tries to get aborted and everyone shows aversion to Raaka which makes him repent. Now as a truly reformed person he acquits Jaswanth & Raju when they again embrace him and also succeeds in acquiring the evidence left by Razdan. At last, Taneja moves to destroy the Shanti Nagar but he is ceased by the 3 warriors. Finally, the movie ends with Raaka sacrificing his life while guarding the public.

Cast
 Jeetendra as Captain Jaswant Kumar
 Sanjay Dutt as Raaka / Rakesh Rai
 Chunky Pandey as Raju 
 Juhi Chawla as Chamki
 Bhanupriya as Seema
 Vinita as Shabnam
 Kiran Kumar as Taneja
 Sharat Saxena as Peter Gonsalves
 Shafi Inamdar as A.V. Razdan
 Sudhir as Jaichand Khurana

Soundtrack

External links

1990s Hindi-language films
1990 films
Films scored by Anand–Milind